Jon Kaplan is an American Grammy Award winning mixer and record producer. He began his career as the bassist for The Hatters (1992-1995), a New York-based jam band signed to Atlantic Records. Upon the dissolution of The Hatters, Kaplan began work as an audio engineer, mixer, and producer. His credits include Sara Bareilles, Gavin DeGraw, Parachute, and Ingrid Michaelson, with Grammy nominations for his work with the reggae band, SOJA, and Contemporary Christian artist Crowder. Kaplan mixed the Zach Williams album, Chainbreaker, which won the 2018 Grammy for Contemporary Christian Album of The Year.

References

Living people
American record producers
Year of birth missing (living people)